This is a list of (some of) the researchers in quantum gravity who have Wikipedia articles.

Jan Ambjørn: expert on dynamical triangulations who helped develop the causal dynamical triangulations approach to quantum gravity.
Augusto Sagnotti: the physicist who demonstrated that perturbative quantum gravity diverges at two loops, and made a number of important contributions to string theory (most notably the discovery of the orientifold, which connects type I string theory to type IIB string theory). 
Giovanni Amelino-Camelia: physicist who developed the idea of doubly special relativity, and founded Quantum-Gravity phenomenology.
Abhay Ashtekar: inventor of the Ashtekar variables, one of the founders of loop quantum gravity.
John Baez: mathematical physicist who introduced the notion of spin foam in loop quantum gravity (a term originally introduced by Wheeler).
Julian Barbour: philosopher and author of The End of Time, Absolute or Relative Motion?: The Discovery of Dynamics.
John W. Barrett: mathematical physicist who helped develop the Barrett–Crane model of quantum gravity.
Martin Bojowald: physicist who developed the application of loop quantum gravity to cosmology.
Steve Carlip: expert on 3-dimensional quantum gravity.
Louis Crane: mathematician who helped develop the Barrett–Crane model of quantum gravity.
Bryce DeWitt: formulated the Wheeler–DeWitt equation for the wavefunction of the Universe with John Archibald Wheeler.
Bianca Dittrich: mathematical physicist known for her contributions to loop quantum gravity and spin foam models, currently working on coarse-graining of spin foams.
Fay Dowker: physicist working on causal sets as well as the interpretation of quantum mechanics.
David Finkelstein: physicist who has contributed much quantum relativity and the logical foundations of QR.
Rodolfo Gambini: physicist who helped introduce loop quantum gravity; coauthor of Loops, Knots, Gauge Theories and Quantum Gravity.
Gary Gibbons: physicist who has done important work on black holes.
Brian Greene: physicist who is considered one of the world's foremost string theorists.
James Hartle: physicist who helped develop the Hartle-Hawking wavefunction for the universe.
Stephen Hawking: leading physicist, expert on black holes and discoverer of Hawking radiation who helped develop the Hartle-Hawking wavefunction for the universe.
 Michał Heller: mathematical physicist, philosopher & theologian working on non-commutative geometry.
Laurent Freidel: mathematical physicist known for his contributions to loop quantum gravity and spin foam models, in particular the Freidel-Krasnov model.
Christopher Isham: physicist who focuses on conceptual problems in quantum gravity.
Ted Jacobson: physicist who helped develop loop quantum gravity.
Michio Kaku: physicist one of the foremost leading String theorist and also known for the Popular Science.
Renate Loll: physicist who worked on loop quantum gravity and more recently helped develop the causal dynamical triangulations approach to quantum gravity.
Luboš Motl: physicist who worked on string theory.
Fotini Markopoulou-Kalamara: physicist who works on loop quantum gravity and spin network models that take causality into account.
Leonardo Modesto: physicist who works on Nonlocal Quantum Gravity a unitary and finite theory of quantum gravity in the quantum field theory framework.
Roger Penrose: mathematical physicist who invented spin networks and twistor theory.
Jorge Pullin: physicist who helped develop loop quantum gravity, co-author of Loops, Knots, Gauge Theories and Quantum Gravity.
Carlo Rovelli: one of the founders and major contributors to loop quantum gravity.
Lee Smolin: one of the founders and major contributors to loop quantum gravity.
Rafael Sorkin: physicist, primary proponent of the causal set approach to quantum gravity.
Andrew Strominger: physicist who works on string theory.
Leonard Susskind: physicist who is considered to be one of the three fathers of string theory.
Frank J. Tipler: mathematical physicist who incorporates quantum gravity into his ideas of a Judeo-Christian God.
Bill Unruh: physicist engaged in the study of semiclassical gravity and responsible for the discovery of the so-called Unruh effect.
Cumrun Vafa: physicist and developer of F-theory, known for Vafa-Witten theorem and Gopakumar-Vafa conjecture.
Robert Wald: physicist in the field of quantum field theory in curved spacetime.
Anzhong Wang: physicist, major contributor to Horava-Lifshitz gravity; String theory and applications to cosmology.
Paul S. Wesson: physicist, cosmologist and writer, known as founder of the "Space-time Consortium" and his work on Kaluza–Klein theory.
John Archibald Wheeler: physicist in the field of quantum gravity due to his development, with Bryce DeWitt, of the Wheeler–DeWitt equation.
Edward Witten: mathematical physicist in string theory and M-Theory

See also
 List of loop quantum gravity researchers
 List of string theorists
 List of contributors to general relativity

References

Lists of physicists by field
 
Research-related lists